Megachile anograe is a species of bee in the family Megachilidae. It was described by Theodore Dru Alison Cockerell in 1908.

References

Anograe
Insects described in 1908